Erlanger is a home rule-class city in Kenton County, Kentucky, United States. It had a 2010 census population of 18,368. Erlanger is part of the Cincinnati-Middletown, OH-KY-IN Metropolitan Statistical Area.

History
Erlanger was founded in the 1880s. The city was named after the Parisian family bank Emile Erlanger & Co. and its founder, Baron Frédéric Émile d'Erlanger, who helped finance the town's early development. In current usage, the name is pronounced in an anglicized way, with neither a French nor German accent. Nearby Elsmere was originally known as "South Erlanger".

Geography
Erlanger is located at  (39.013511, -84.594042).

Demographics
As of the 2000 census, there were 16,676 people, 6,597 households, and 4,406 families living in the city. The racial makeup of the city was 60% White, 27% African American, 0.02% Native American, 0.04% Asian, 0.02% Pacific Islander, 0.42% from other races, and 1.87% from two or more races. Hispanic or Latino of any race were 10% of the population. A small Mauritanian community is also present.

There were 6,597 households, out of which 51.8% had children under the age of 18 living with them, 32.1% were married couples living together, 33.8% had a female householder with no husband present, and 11.1% were non-families. 28.0% of all households were made up of individuals, and 9.3% had someone living alone who was 65 years of age or older. The average household size was 2.50 and the average family size was 4.09.

The age range was 26.4% under the age of 18, 8.7% from 18 to 24, 33.0% from 25 to 44, 20.2% from 45 to 64, and 11.7% who were 65 years of age or older. The median age was 34 years. For every 100 females, there were 92.8 males. For every 100 females age 18 and over, there were 87.8 males.

The median income for a household in the city was $29,835, and the median income for a family was $40,442. Males had a median income of $21,585 versus $19,296 for females. The per capita income for the city was $17,834. About 27.0% of families and 29.8% of the population were below the poverty line, including 42.0% of those under age 18 and 33.6% of those age 65 or over.

Neighborhoods

Erlanger has multiple neighborhoods within city limits such as Cherry Hill (partially in Boone County), Central Erlanger (the section marked between streets Sunset Ave. and Commonwealth Ave.), an industrial area surrounding the Cincinnati Airport (includes Mineola Pike), Historic Erlanger (between Riggs Ave. and Crescent Ave.), Northeast Erlanger (Dixie Hwy. & Stevenson Rd. through Turkeyfoot Rd.), North Central Erlanger (Erlanger Rd. and Riggs Ave. to Rosary Dr.)

Economy
Toyota Boshoku America and Perfetti Van Melle, an Italian confectionery, have both its headquarters and a manufacturing plant in Erlanger.

The United States Playing Card Company's corporate headquarters are also located in the town.

Online furniture and home goods retailer Wayfair operates a 900,000-s.f. fulfillment center on a 52-acre site near CVG airport.

Companies like Wayfair “can set up a facility here and within a day they can access several million people from Toronto all the way down to Atlanta,” said Lee Crume, Tri-ED president and CEO. “You just have this tremendous logistical reach by being physically present in Northern Kentucky

In January 2017, Amazon.com announced they would build an Amazon Prime Air hub in Erlanger, and that it would be expected to bring approximately 2,000 new jobs with it, in addition to 10,000 that Amazon already had in Kentucky.

The global shipping center Pitney Bowes, often used to send international purchases, is located in Erlanger.

Education
Much of Erlanger and much of its neighbor Elsmere are served by the  Erlanger/Elsmere School District, which operates four elementary schools, one middle school, and one high school.

A portion of Erlanger is in the Kenton County School District.

Erlanger is served by a branch of the Kenton County Public Library.

References

External links 

 Official website

Cities in Kentucky
Cities in Kenton County, Kentucky